Sir Cleave More, 2nd Baronet  (5 March 1664 – 1730), of Bank Hall, Walton, Lancashire, was a Whig politician  who sat in the House of Commons from 1709 to 1710.

More was the fifth, but eldest surviving son  of Sir Edward More, 1st Baronet, of Bank Hall Walton  and his wife  Dorothy Fenwick, daughter of Sir William Fenwick of Meldon, Northumberland. He succeeded his father to the baronetcy in October 1678.   He was educated at Westminster School; and matriculated at Christ Church, Oxford in  1682.  In 1691, he married Anne Edmunds, daughter. of John Edmunds of Cumberlow, Hertfordshire.

At the 1708 British general election, More stood for Parliament  as a Whig  at  Bramber but was defeated in the poll. However he petitioned and was seated as Member of Parliament for Bramber  on 15 January 1709. He spent much of his time in Parliament taking forward a scheme to provide a water supply for Liverpool. He voted for the naturalization of the Palatines, in 1709 and for the impeachment of Dr Sacheverell in 1710. He did not stand at the 1710 British general election.

More died at St Anne's, Aldersgate, in London on 3 March 1730 leaving one son, Joseph, who succeeded to the baronetcy.

References

1664 births
1730 deaths
Members of the Parliament of Great Britain for English constituencies
Baronets in the Baronetage of England